Universities South Africa (USAf), formerly known as Higher Education South Africa or HESA,  is an umbrella body representative of the 26 public universities in South Africa. USAf endorses a comprehensive and equitable national higher education system that is responsive to the challenges facing South Africa. Through lobbying and advocacy, USAf promotes and facilitates an optimal environment conducive for universities to function effectually and maximally contribute to the social, cultural, and economic advancement of South Africa and its people.

Background 
Universities South Africa (USAf), is a membership organisation of the (current) 26 public universities in South Africa. USAf, previously known as Higher Education South Africa (HESA), was formed on 9 May 2005, as the successor to the two statutory representative organisations for universities and technikons (now universities of technology), the South African Universities Vice-Chancellors Association (SAUVCA) and the Committee of Technikon Principals (CTP). The launch of HESA was partly driven by the restructuring of the higher education sector, which resulted in the establishment of new institutional types, but also by the need for a strong, unified body of leadership. USAf represents all 26 public universities and universities of technology in South Africa and is a section 21 company. 

SAUVCA was established as a statutory body for the 21 public universities in South Africa by the Universities Act (Act 61 of 1955). As a statutory body, it made recommendations to the Minister and Director-General of Education on matters referred to it or alternatively on any other issues, which it deemed important for universities. The CTP was a national higher education association established in 1967 regarding the Advanced Technical Education Act (No. 40 of 1967). It consisted of the rectors, principals and [Chancellor (education)|Vice-Chancellors] of technikons in South Africa.

HESA changed its name to Universities South Africa on 22 July 2015.

Programmes 
The Universities South Africa programmes include the following:
 Entrepreneurship Development in Higher Education
 Higher Education Leadership and Management Programme (HELM)

Higher Education Enrolment Services Programme 
 Matriculation Board

Members 
 Cape Peninsula University of Technology
 Central University of Technology
 Durban University of Technology
 Mangosuthu University of Technology
 Nelson Mandela University
 North-West University
 Rhodes University
 Sefako Makgatho Health Sciences University
 Sol Plaatje University
 Stellenbosch University
 Tshwane University of Technology
 University of South Africa
 University of the Free State
 University of Cape Town
 University of Fort Hare
 University of Johannesburg
 University of KwaZulu-Natal
 University of Limpopo
 University of Mpumalanga
 University of Pretoria
 University of the Western Cape
 University of the Witwatersrand
 University of Venda
 University of Zululand
 Vaal University of Technology
Walter Sisulu University

References

External links 

College and university associations and consortia in Africa
Higher education in South Africa
2005 establishments in South Africa